Angus MacLean (September 22, 1891 – December 15, 1972) was a Canadian politician. He served in the Legislative Assembly of British Columbia from 1949 to 1952  from the electoral district of Cariboo, a member of the Coalition government.

References

1891 births
1972 deaths